Sighing Peak is a  peak in Antarctica. It is located at the south side of the entrance to Stonehouse Bay on the east side of Adelaide Island. It was first sighted and surveyed in 1909 by the French Antarctic Expedition under Jean-Baptiste Charcot. It was resurveyed in 1948 by the Falkland Islands Dependencies Survey (FIDS) and so named by them because of the persistent sighing of wind from the summit of this peak, even when apparently calm at sea level.

Mountains of Adelaide Island